This is a list of musicians who have been awarded in the International Johann Sebastian Bach Competition in Leipzig since its foundation in 1950.

Competition by year

1950 
Piano
 1　Tatiana Nikolayeva
 2　Galina Feodorowa, Margarita Fyodorova
 3　Jörg Demus, Waldemar Maciszewski
Organ
 1　Amadeus Webersinke, Karl Richter
 2　Ludwig Dörr, Gerhard Tipp
 3　Walter Schönheit, Diethard Hellmann
Harpsichord
 2　Ingrid Heiler
Voice
 2　Eva Fleischer
 3　Alina Bolechowska, Christa Maria Ziese
Violin
 1　Igor Besrodny
 2　Michail Waimann, Alexei Gorokhov
 3　Werner Häutling, Agnes Vadas

 1964 Piano 1　Ilse Graubin
 2　Wolfgang Wappler, Melita Dukowa-Kolin
 3　Igor Lazko, Gerhard Erber, Brunhild PartschOrgan 1　Petr Sovadina
 2　Karl-Rainer Böhme, Andreas Buschnakowski
 3　Jan HoraVoice 1　Bruce Abel
 2　Wolfgang Hellmich, Rolf Wollrad
 3　Wladimir Swistow

 1968 Piano 1　Valery Afanassiev
 2　Ivan Klánský
 3　Evgeni KoroliovOrgan 1　Henning Wagner
 2　Daniel Chorzempa
 3　Christian CollumVoice 1　Heidi Berthold-Riess
 2　Eberhard Büchner
 3　Siegfried LorenzViolin 1　Oleg Kagan
 2　Christian Funke
 3　Andras Kiss

 1972 Piano 1　Winfried Apel
 2　Jean-Louis Steuermann
 3　Michail Petuchow
 4　Gabriele Kupfernagel
 5　Wadim SacharowOrgan 1　Heribert Metzger
 2　Istvan Ella
 3　Hans Fagius
 4　Friedrich Kircheis
 5　Gottfried PrellerHarpsichord 1　Lionel Party
 2　Armin Thalheim
 3　Gyöngyver Szilvassy
 4　Alexander Sung
 5　Magdalena MyczkaVoice – female 1　Rosemarie Lang
 2　Regina Werner
 3　Julianne Paszthy
 4　Nadeshda WainerVoice – male 1　Dieter Weimann
 2　Gheorghe-Emil Crasnaru
 3　Peter Tschaplik
 4　Frank-Peter SpätheViolin 1　Wladimir Iwanow
 2　Konrad Other
 3　Lidija Schutko

 1976 Piano 1　Michail Woltschok
 2　Larissa Dedowa
 3　Dietmar Nawroth
 4　Konstantin Preda
 5　Emma TachmisjanOrgan 1　Elisabeth Ullmann
 2　Joachim Dalitz
 3　Hartmut Rohmeyer
 4　Matthias Eisenberg
 5　Thomas SauerVoice – female 1　Carola Nossek
 2　Katalin Pitti
 3　Nannita Peschke
 4　Ursula Ankele-FischerVoice – male 1　Waldemar Wild
 2　Gábor Németh
 3　Frieder Lang
 4　Miloslav PodalskyViolin 1　Nilla Pierrou
 2　Thorsten Rosenbusch
 3　Daniel Phillips
 4　Ralf-Carsten Brömsel
 5　René HenriotCello 1　Alexander Rudin
 2　Yvan Chiffoleau
 3　Josef Feigelson
 4　Tamas Koó
 5　Akiko Kanamaru

 1980 Piano 1　Anaid Nersesjan
 2　Kei Itoh
 3　Irina Berkowitsch
 4　Bair Schagdaron
 5　Gerald FauthOrgan 1　Zsuzsana Elekes
 2　Jaroslav Tůma
 3　Kristiane Köbler
 4　Bernhard Buttmann
 5　Matthias SüßVoice – female 1　Jadwiga Rappé
 2　Liliana Bizineche
 3　Monika Straube
 4　Gabriele PietschniggVoice – male 1　Yukio Imanaka
 2　Andreas Sommerfeld
 3　Christoph Rösel
 4　Andreas ScheibnerViolin 1　Michael Erxleben
 2　Thorsten Janicke
 3　Waltraut Wächter
 4　Carlos Egry-Bulnes
 5　Dora BratschkowaCello 1　Kerstin Feltz
 2　Marin Cazacu
 3　Michael Nellessen
 4　Thomas Ahrndt
 5　Matthias Bräutigam

 1984 Piano 1　Alexander Paley
 2　Susanne Grutzmann
 3　Noriko Kodama
 4　Walery Pjasetzkij
 5　Ueli WigetOrgan 1　John Gavin Scott
 2　Christoph Mehner
 3　Michael Schönheit
 4　Arvid Gast
 5　Rainer Maria RückschloßVoice – female 1　Angela Liebold
 2　Bettina Denner-Deckelmann
 3　Constanta Adriana Mestes
 4　Uta SelbigVoice – male 1　Egbert Junghanns
 2　Kenzo Ishii
 3　Ralph Eschrig
 4　Mario HoffViolin 1　Johannes Ludwig Von Schwartz
 2　Birgit Jahn
 3　Anna Rabinova
 4　Lothar Strauß
 5　Kai VoglerFlute 1　Wolfgang Ritter
 2　Monika Hegedüs
 3　Matthias Rust
 4　Alison Mitchell
 5　Karin Beck

 1988 Piano 1　Gerald Fauth
 2　Nikolai Lugansky
 3　Alexej Botowinow
 4　Albrecht Hartmann
 5　Megumi Hashiba
 6　Dana SasinowaOrgan 1　Martin Sander
 2　Stefan Kircheis
 3　Wolfgang Kläsener
 4　Valter Savant-Levet
 5　Andreas Strobelt
 6　Markus LangVoice – female 2　Kerstin Klesse
 3　Katherina Müller
 4　Naomi Tsuji
 5　Reinhild Wäntig
 6　Bożena HarasimowiczVoice – male 2　Matthias Bleidorn
 3　Frank Schiller
 4　Daniel Kaleta
 5　Torsten Frisch
 6　Fred HoffmannViolin 1　Antje Weithaas
 2　Katrin Scholz
 3　Kazimierz Olechowski
 4　Hiroko Suzuki
 5　Marat Bisengaliew
 6　Denitza KazakovaCello 1　Marc Coppey
 2　Michael Sanderling
 3　Raphaël Pidoux
 4　Anton Istomin
 5　Sybille Hesselbarth
 6　Friedemann Ludwig

 1992 Piano 2　Ragna Schirmer
 3　Juri Bogdanov
 4　Yukiyo Endo
 5　Anna Schibaeva BeloOrgan 2　Luca Antoniotti, Michael Bloss
 3　Valter Savant-LevetHarpsichord 2　Daniela Numico
 3　Anikó Soltész, Mechthild Stark
 4　Akiko Kuwagata
 6　Agnes VárallyayViolin 1　Rachel Barton
 2　Thomas Timm, Axel Strauß
 4　Albrecht WinterVoice – female 1　Bogna Bartosz
 2　Yvonne Albes
 3　Alla Simonichvili
 4　Antje Perscholka
 5　Bettine Eismann
 6　Irina PotapenkoVoice – male 2　Jochen Kupfer
 4　Dietrich Greve

 1996 Piano 2　Cornelia Herrmann
 3　Christopher HinterhuberOrgan　
 No prize awardedHarpsichord 3　Giampietro RosatoViolin 2　Natsumi Tamai
 3　Amanda Favier, Aki SunaharaVoice – female 2　Klaudia Zeiner, Simone Kermes, Anne ButerVoice – male 1　Christoph Genz
 2　Ekkehard Abele
 3　Ralf Ernst, Marcus Volpert

 1998 Piano 2　Ragna Schirmer
 3　Miku Nishimoto-Neubert, Mari KokuhoCello 1　Emil Rovner
 2　Renaud Déjardin
 3　Ophélie GaillardVoice – female 1　Asako Motojima
 2　Letizia Scherrer
 3　Konstanze MaxseinVoice – male 1　Jan Kobow
 2　Andreas Post, Matthias Vieweg
 3　Marcus Niedermeyr

 2000 Harpsichord 2　Wiebke Weidanz, Pieter-Jan Belder
 3　Philippe LeroyOrgan 1　Johannes Unger
 2　Gunther Rost
 3　Yuichiro Shiina

 2002 Piano 1　Martin Stadtfeld
 2　Andrew Brownell, Eric FungViolin and Baroque violin 2　Laura Vikman
 3　Sonja StarkeVoice – female 1　Franziska Gottwald
 2　Sigrid Horvath
 3　Barbara TišlerVoice – male 1　Dominik Wörner
 2　Daniel Johannsen
 3　Seung-Hee Park

 2004 Cello and Baroque cello 1　Olivier Marron
 2　Adam Mital
 3　Richard HarwoodVoice 1　Julius Pfeifer
 2　Trine Wilsberg Lund
 3　Markus FlaigOrgan 1　Jörg Halubek
 2　Elke Eckerstorfer
 3　Frédéric Champion

 2006 Harpsichord 1　Francesco Corti
 2　Ilpo Laspas
 3　François GuerrierPiano 1　Irina Zahharenkova
 2　Varvara Nepomnyashchaya
 3　Elena VorotkoViolin and Baroque violin 1　Elfa Rún Kristinsdóttir
 2　Mayumi Hirasaki
 3　Dmitry Sinkovsky

 2008 Organ 1 Bálint Karosi
 2 Ilpo Laspas
 3 Lukas StolhofVoice 1 Marie Friederike Schoder
 2 Margot Oitzinger
 3 Jens HamannCello and Baroque cello 1 Philip Higham
 2 Toru Yamamoto
 3 Davit Melkonyan

 2010 Piano 1 Ilya Poletaev
 2  Stepan Simonian
 3 Ekaterina RichterHarpsichord 1 Maria Uspenskaya
 2 Magdalena Malec
 3 Nadja LesaulnierViolin and Baroque violin 1 Evgeny Sviridov
 2 Shunsuke Sato
 3 Friederike Starkloff

 2012 Organ1. Johannes Lang
2. Sebastian Küchler-Blessing
3. Matthias NeumannVoice1. Dávid Szigetvári
2. Benno Schachtner
3. Matthias WinckhlerCello and Baroque cello1. Beiliang Zhu
2. Ditta Rohmann
3. Clara Pouvreau

 2014 Piano1. Hilda Huang, United States
2. Schaghajegh Nosrati, Germany
3. Georg Kjurdian, LatviaHarpsichord1. Jean-Christophe Dijoux, France
2. Olga Pashchenko, Russia
3. Alexandra Nepomnyashchaya, RussiaViolin and Baroque violin1. Seiji Okamoto, Japan
2. Marie Radauer-Plank, Austria
3. Niek Baar, Netherlands

 2016 Organ1. Kazuki Tomita, Japan
2. Pavel Svoboda, Czech Republic
3. Alina Nikitina, Russia
 Voice1. Patrick Grahl, Tenor, Germany
2. Raphael Höhn, Tenor, Switzerland
3. Geneviève Tschumi, Contralto, Switzerland
 Cello and Baroque cello1. Paolo Bonomini, Cello, Italy
2. Ursina Braun, Cello, Switzerland
3. Vladimir Waltham, Baroque cello, France/United Kingdom

2018Piano1. Rachel Naomi Kudo (US)
2. Arash Rokni (Iran)
3. Jonathan Ferrucci (Australia/Italy)Harpsichord1. Avinoam Shalev (Israel)
2. Andrew Rosenblum (US)
3. Anastasia Antonova (Russia)Violin1. Maria Włoszczowska (Poland)
2. Maia Cabeza (US/Canada)
3. Hed Yaron Meyerson (Germany/Israel) Baroque violin

2020
The 2020 Competition in Leipzig has been canceled due to the Corona crisis.2022Piano 1. Olga Davnis (Russia)
 2. Mattia Fusi (Italy)
 3. Eden Agranat Meged (Israel)Harpsichord 1. Alexander von Heißen (Germany)
 2. Irene González Roldán (Spain)
 3. Dmytro Kokoshynskyy (Ukraine)Violin/Baroque Violin'''

 1. Charlotte Spruit (Netherlands)
 2. Qingzhu Weng (China)
 3. Sophia Prodanova (Bulgaria)

References

External links 
 List of prize-winners on the official website

Lists of musicians
Bach